Bon Appétit is an American food and entertaining magazine.

Bon Appétit may also refer to:

Businesses
 Bon Appétit (restaurant), Malahide, Ireland
 Bon Appétit Management Company, an American restaurant company

Film and television
 Bon Appétit (film), a 2010 romantic drama by David Pinillos
 Bon Appetit! (TV series) or Gochisōsan, a Japanese drama series

Music
 Bon Appetit (album), an album by O.C., or the title song
 "Bon Appétit" (song), a song by Katy Perry

Video games
 Cooking Mama 5: Bon Appétit!, a cookery simulation game
 Senran Kagura: Bon Appétit!, a rhythm cooking game

See also
 Bone-Appetit!, an album by T-Bone